Bhaba Nagar, also known as Sungra or some times as Bawa Nagar, is a town in Himachal Pradesh, arranged between Taranda and Nathpa Jhakri Dam, on the left bank of Satluj around 12 km downstream from Wangtu.

The township, previously known as Sungra or Pashke, was settled to oblige the workers of Bhaba hydroelectric plant by Himachal Pradesh State Electricity Board also known as Sanjay Jal Vidyut Pariyojana. The town is now de facto headquarter of Nichar tehsil of the district Kinnaur. 

Bhaba Nagar (or Sungra) is neighboured by villages such as Kangos, Kache, Nichar, Thanang, Ponda, Bari, Baro, Nigulsari and Taranda on the left bank of Satluj. And on the right bank of Satluj the town is neighboured by villages namely Gharshu, Nathpa, Kachrang, Rockcharang, Kamba, Rupi, Shorang and Salaring.

Over the years, Bhaba Nagar (Sungra) has become a commercial and cultural hub for the lower part of the Kinnaur. Every year, during the summer, a three-day cultural festival known as Jatru is organised at Bhaba Nagar. Bhaba Nagar is also second biggest commercial centre in kinnaur after Reckong Peo

Gorals and elands are seen here and there in higher ranges.

References 

Cities and towns in Kinnaur district